Adulis (Sabaean: ሰበኣ
Its ruins lie within the modern Eritrean city of Zula. It was the emporium considered part of the D’mt and Kingdom of Adulis Or Adulis empires. It was close to Greece and the Byzantine Empire, with its luxury goods and trade routes. Its location can be included in the area known to the ancient Egyptians as the Land of the Gods, perhaps coinciding with the locality of Wddt, recorded in the geographical list of the Eighteenth Dynasty of Egypt.

History
Pliny the Elder is the earliest European writer to mention Adulis (N.H. 6.34). He misunderstood the name of the place, thinking the toponym meant that it had been founded by escaped Egyptian slaves. Pliny further stated that it was the 'principal mart for the Troglodytae and the people of Aethiopia'. Adulis is also mentioned in the Periplus of the Erythraean Sea, a guide of the Red Sea and the Indian Ocean. The latter guide describes the settlement as an emporium for the ivory, hides, slaves and other exports of the interior. Roman merchants used the port in the second and third century AD.

Cosmas Indicopleustes records two inscriptions he found here in the 6th century: the first records how Ptolemy Euergetes (247–222 BC) used war elephants captured in the region to gain victories in his wars abroad; the second, known as the Monumentum Adulitanum, was inscribed in the 27th year of a king of Axum, perhaps named Sembrouthes, boasting of his victories in Arabia and northern Ethiopia.

A fourth century work traditionally (but probably incorrectly) ascribed to the writer Palladius of Galatia, relates the journey of an anonymous Egyptian lawyer (scholasticus) to India in order to investigate Brahmin philosophy. He was accompanied part of the way by one Moise or Moses, the Bishop of Adulis.

Control of Adulis allowed Axum to be the major power on the Red Sea. This port was the principal staging area for Kaleb's invasion of the Himyarite kingdom of Dhu Nuwas around 520. While the scholar Yuri Kobishchanov detailed a number of raids Aksumites made on the Arabian coast (the latest being in 702, when the port of Jeddah was occupied), and argued that Adulis was later captured by the Muslims, which brought to an end Axum's naval ability and contributed to the Aksumite Kingdom's isolation from the Byzantine Empire and other traditional allies, the last years of Adulis are a mystery. Muslim writers occasionally mention both Adulis and the nearby Dahlak Archipelago as places of exile. The evidence suggests that Axum maintained its access to the Red Sea, yet experienced a clear decline in its fortunes from the seventh century onwards. In any case, the sea power of Axum waned and security for the Red Sea fell on other shoulders.

Archeological excavations

Adulis was one of the first Axumite sites to undergo excavation, when a French mission to Eritrea under Vignaud and Petit performed an initial survey in 1840, and prepared a map which marked the location of three structures they believed were temples. In 1868, workers attached to Napier's campaign against Tewodros II visited Adulis and exposed several buildings, including the foundations of a Byzantine-like church.

The first scientific excavations at Adulis were undertaken by a German expedition in 1906, under the supervision of R. Sundström. Sundström worked in the northern sector of the site, exposing a large structure, which he dubbed the "palace of Adulis", as well as recovering Axumite coinage. The expedition's results were published in four volumes in 1913.

The Italian Roberto Paribeni excavated in Adulis the following year, discovering many structures similar to what Sundström had found earlier, as well as a number of ordinary dwellings. He found a lot of pottery: even wine amphorae imported from the area of modern Aqaba were found here during the decades of existence of the colony of Italian Eritrea. These types now called Ayla-Axum Amphoras have since been found at other sites in Eritrea including on Black Assarca Island.

Over 50 years passed until the next series of excavations, when in 1961 and 1962 the Ethiopian Institute of Archeology sponsored an expedition led by Francis Anfray. This excavation not only recovered materials showing a strong affinities with the late Axumite kingdom, but a destruction layer. This in turn prompted Kobishchanov to later argue that Adulis had been destroyed by an Arab raid in the mid-7th century, a view that has since been partially rejected.

A pair of fragments of glass vessels were found in the lowest layers at Adulis, which are similar to specimens from the 18th Dynasty of Egypt. One very specialised imported vessel discovered at the site was a Menas flask. It was stamped with a design showing the Egyptian St. Menas between two kneeling camels. Such vessels are supposed to have held water from a spring near the saint's tomb in Egypt (Paribeni 1907: 538, fig. 54), and this particular one may have been brought to Adulis by a pilgrim.

Since Eritrean Independence, the National Museum of Eritrea has petitioned the Government of Ethiopia to return artifacts of these excavations. To date they have been denied.

Previous colonial researches were underpinned by an old Ethiopian narrative. Most of these chronicles puts Adulis smack-dab at the middle of the Axumite kingdom and subsumes it as an integral part of this very kingdom. As a result, Adulis has been studied as part and parcel of the Axumite kingdom by most, if not all, scholars of the region. However, recent historical/archaeological sources challenge the Abyssinian paradigm in the sense that Adulis was the center of a kingdom that was not a constituent part of the Axumite kingdom, on the earlier period prior to the emergence of Aksum.

See also
Keskese
Matara
Nakfa
Qohaito
Sembel

Notes

References
 G W Bowersock.  The Throne of Adulis: Red Sea wars on the eve of Islam.  Oxford: University Press. 2013.  (reviewed by Peter Thonemann in "Gates of Horn", Times Literary Supplement, 6 December 2013, pp. 9–10)
 Stuart Munro-Hay. Aksum: An African Civilization of Late Antiquity. Edinburgh: University Press. 1991. 
 Yuri M. Kobishchanov. Axum (Joseph W. Michels, editor; Lorraine T. Kapitanoff, translator). University Park, Pennsylvania: Pennsylvania State Univ. Press, 1979. 

Aksumite cities
Archaeological sites in Eritrea
Former populated places in Eritrea
Massawa
Northern Red Sea Region
Ancient Greek geography of East Africa